
Gmina Bardo is an urban-rural gmina (administrative district) in Ząbkowice Śląskie County, Lower Silesian Voivodeship, in south-western Poland.

Neighbouring gminas
Gmina Bardo is bordered by the gminas of Kamieniec Ząbkowicki, Kłodzko, Stoszowice, Ząbkowice Śląskie and Złoty Stok.

Villages
Apart from the town of Bardo, the gmina contains the villages of Brzeźnica, Dębowina, Dzbanów, Grochowa, Janowiec, Laskówka, Opolnica, Potworów and Przyłęk.

Twin towns – sister cities

Gmina Bardo is twinned with:
 Česká Skalice, Czech Republic
 Tarnowo Podgórne, Poland
 Týn nad Vltavou, Czech Republic

References

Bardo
Ząbkowice Śląskie County